Thilak Senasinghe is an explorer and research enthusiast of famous mythical beliefs of Sri Lankan culture. He tries to unearth the deep inherent scientific truth embedded in the delusional beliefs and blind faith that have crept into the popular Buddhism of Sri Lanka.

He has published several books, essays and newspaper articles in Sinhala about the psychological facet of the deeply rooted mythical practices in Sri Lanka such as devil possessions, evil spirits, witchcraft, exorcism, sorcery, curses, spells and charms and various other issues connected with occult practices in Sri Lanka.

“Janakantha Mithya Matha “, “Manaranjana Mithya Katha”, “Kemmura Thenna”, “Sudu Paravi Mal”, “Agni Chamara”, “Sasala Vila” and "Avathara Luhubanda", are among his bestselling books based on the above-mentioned subject.

“Sasala Vila “ is the first novel of this kind which revolves around the character of a so-called ‘Spiritual Healer' who claims to have healing powers. The novel cleverly refutes the fraudulent and hoodwinking practices of this man and the hoax is exposed. The novel throws light on psychological explanations to the unhealthy and false beliefs of this kind and tries to enlighten the innocent people who are misled by the tricksters of the trade.

A journalist by profession, Senasinghe is the editor of the women's weekly, “RAJINA”,a publication of Lakbima Newspapers Ltd, Sri Lanka.

References

 "Nature of insanity and regaining sanity", Daily News,March 17, 2010
 "A thought for Poson", Daily News,June 10, 2009
 "Rejina Tabloid"

Sri Lankan novelists
Living people
1958 births